Faizal Maksum was one of the leaders of an anti-Soviet group known as the Basmachi and led an organized resistance against the Soviet military occupation of Central Asia in the 1920s. Maksum was loyal to the ousted Emir of Bukhara and operated primarily on the border of the Soviet republic of Tajikistan and Afghanistan. In 1929 Faizal Maksum led a raid from Afghanistan into Tajikistan during the short reign of the Afghan Emir Habibullāh Kalakāni. In this raid his forces briefly captured the town of Garm in central Tajikistan, until Soviet forces supplied by air expelled Basmachi forces from the town.

References 

Basmachi movement
20th-century Tajikistani people
Afghan Civil War (1928–1929)